Broderick Bernard Jones (born May 16, 2001) is an American football offensive tackle for the Georgia Bulldogs. He is a two-time CFP national champion with the Bulldogs, winning in 2021 and 2022.

High school career 
Jones attended Lithonia High School in Lithonia, Georgia. He received his first athletic scholarship offer while he was a ninth grade high school student from Alabama. As a senior, he was considered one of the best offensive lineman in the class of 2020 and was a part of the Under Amour All-American Game.  A five star recruit, Jones committed to play college football at the University of Georgia.

College career 
As a freshman in 2020, Jones was a redshirt player. In 2021, his production increased and he made four starts in relief for Jamaree Salyer, who was injured. He was named to the 2021 SEC All-Freshman Team.

References

External links 
 
 Georgia Bulldogs bio

Living people
Georgia Bulldogs football players
Players of American football from Georgia (U.S. state)
People from Lithonia, Georgia
American football offensive tackles
African-American players of American football
2001 births